Valeriu is a Romanian-language masculine given name, and may refer to:

Valeriu Cosarciuc
Valeriu Cotea
Valeriu Traian Frențiu
Valeriu Gaiu
Valeriu Ghilețchi
Valeriu Graur
Valeriu Lazăr
Valeriu Lazarov
Valeriu Marcu
Valeriu Matei
Valeriu Moldovan
Valeriu Munteanu (philologist)
Valeriu Munteanu (politician)
Valeriu Stoica
Valeriu Streleț
Valeriu Tabără
Valeriu Turcan

See also 

 Valerius (name)

 Valery (name)
 Valerie (given name)

 Valeria (given name)
 Valerian (name)
 Valeriano (name)
 Valerianus (disambiguation)

 Valer (disambiguation)
 Valera (disambiguation)
 Valérien (disambiguation)

 
 

Romanian masculine given names